John Francis Miles (born 28 September 1981) is an English footballer.

Career

Liverpool
Miles, who is a forward, was a product of the Liverpool Academy, and progressed as far as the reserve team, but in 2002 he was told he had no future at the club.

Stoke City
He joined Stoke City in March 2002, with a short-term contract until the end of the season. He only made one substitute appearance for the club in April replacing Bjarni Guðjónsson in a league match against Bristol City. He was released by the club in the summer.

Crewe Alexandra
He subsequently moved to Crewe Alexandra, initially on a monthly contract before signing on a season-long deal in October. He made his club debut in August against Colchester. He scored his only goal for Crewe on New Year's Day in 2003 in a 2–0 win against Mansfield Town. In total, he played nine games for Crewe, but struggled to establish himself in the first-team.

Macclesfield Town (loan)
In March 2003 he was loaned out to Macclesfield Town. He scored four goals in eight games during his loan spell, including scoring on his club debut against Kidderminster Harriers and twice in an away victory over Shrewsbury Town, where he scored the winning goal during injury time.

Macclesfield Town
He joined Macclesfield in a permanent move in May 2003 after a successful trial and he remained at Macclesfield until May 2007.

Accrington Stanley
Although offered a new deal at Macclesfield in the summer of 2007, he rejected the contract and opted to move to instead to league two rivals Accrington Stanley on a free transfer.

MK Dons (loan)
On 24 January 2008 it was confirmed he had completed a loan move to Milton Keynes Dons with a view to a permanent deal, re-uniting with his former Macclesfield boss Paul Ince, though after 12 games and no goals his loan spell ended and he returned to Accrington. On his return from loan he still has one year left on his contract, but over the subsequent season he played regularly and in June 2009 re-signed for the club on a one-year contract extension.

Fleetwood Town
In May 2010 he was offered a new contract by Stanley but in June he signed for newly promoted Conference National side Fleetwood Town.

Droylsden (loan)
During his time with Fleetwood he went on loan to Droylsden He was not offered a new contract by Fleetwood at the end of the season and was released, along with a number of other players.

Stockport County
In July 2011 he joined Stockport County but was released by the club on 31 January 2012.

Altrincham
His next move was to join Altrincham a few days later. He was named man of the match on his club debut in February. He was released by the club at the end of the season having made 11 first-team appearances.

Warrington Town
In September 2012 he joined Warrington Town, making his debut in a 6–1 away victory over New Mills and scoring on his home debut three days later as they beat Curzon Ashton 3–2.

Career statistics
Source:

A.  The "Other" column constitutes appearances and goals in the Football League Trophy.

Honours
Milton Keynes Dons
Football League Two (IV): 2008

References

External links
 
 

1981 births
Living people
Sportspeople from Bootle
Association football forwards
English footballers
Liverpool F.C. players
Stoke City F.C. players
Crewe Alexandra F.C. players
Macclesfield Town F.C. players
Accrington Stanley F.C. players
Milton Keynes Dons F.C. players
Fleetwood Town F.C. players
Droylsden F.C. players
Stockport County F.C. players
Altrincham F.C. players
English Football League players
National League (English football) players
Warrington Town F.C. players
Northern Premier League players
Cammell Laird 1907 F.C. players